Quit Staring at My Plate  is a 2016 Croatian-Danish drama film written and directed by Hana Jušić.

The film premiered in the Venice Days section at the 73rd edition of the Venice Film Festival, in which it was awarded the Fedeora Award for Best European Film. It was selected as the Croatian entry for the Best Foreign Language Film at the 90th Academy Awards, but it was not nominated.

Plot    
After her domineering father has a stroke, a 24-year-old woman becomes the sole breadwinner of a family. She adjusts to her newfound role and the freedom that it gives. An overbearing responsibility of supporting her entitled mother and lazy older brother who the family has treated as disabled breaks and mends her from time to time.

Cast  

 Mia Petričević as  Marijana
 Nikša Butijer as Zoran 
 Arijana Čulina as Vera 
 Zlatko Burić as Lazo 
 Karla Brbić as Andjela 
 Bruna Bebić-Tudor as Ivana 
 Marijana Mikulić as Katarina

See also
 List of submissions to the 90th Academy Awards for Best Foreign Language Film
 List of Croatian submissions for the Academy Award for Best Foreign Language Film

References

External links  

2016 drama films
Danish drama films
Croatian drama films
2016 directorial debut films